This is a list of megalithic monument on the island of Ireland. Megalithic monuments are found throughout Ireland, and include burial sites (such as megalithic tombs) and ceremonial sites (such as stone circles).

See also

 Irish megalithic tombs
 List of archaeological sites in County Antrim
 List of archaeological sites in County Cork
 List of archaeological sites in County Fermanagh
 List of archaeological sites in County Tyrone

References

External links
 Irish Megaliths: Field Guide & Photographs by Anthony Weir
 Megalithomania: The Home of Irish Prehistory
 Megalithic Ireland.com
 Megalithic Monuments of Ireland.com
 The Sacred Island

Prehistoric Ireland
 
 
 Megalithic